Petit Jean Electric Cooperative is a non-profit rural electric utility cooperative headquartered in Clinton, Arkansas, with a district office in Marshall, Arkansas.

The Cooperative was organized in October 1940, but due to World War II never laid any new power lines. The Cooperative would then relocate to Clinton as a result of the purchase. Later, in October 1945, the Cooperative would purchase  of line from Arkansas Power & Light (now a subsidiary of Entergy), nearly tripling the size of the Cooperative's territory, and in the 1950s extended to the Marshall area by purchasing the service area power lines from Carroll Electric Cooperative.

The Cooperative serves a territory generally surrounding Clinton and Marshall.

External links
Petit Jean Electric Cooperative
Index of PJE Member-initiated correspondence and response.

Companies based in Arkansas
Electric cooperatives in Arkansas